Chifeng University (赤峰学院) is a public university formed by the combination of Chifeng Normal College of Nationalities and other four academies. It was approved by the Ministry of Education of the People's Republic of China in 2003. It is in the city of Chifeng, the birthplace of the Hong Shan cultures. (The city has scenic spots and is a tourist destination.) The university has 24 colleges or departments

Schools and departments 

 Medical College (M.B.B.S/B.D.S recognized by IMED)
 Mongolian Literature and History Institute
 College of Liberal Arts
 College of Foreign Languages
 University Ministry of Foreign Language Teaching
 Academy of Music
 Academy of Fine Arts
 Politics and Law Institute
 Economics and Management
 History and Culture
 School of Education Science
 Institute of Physical Education
 School of Mathematics and Statistics
 Resources and Environmental Sciences
 Physics and Electronics and Information Engineering
 Computer and Information Engineering
 Chemistry and Chemical Engineering
 School of Life Sciences
 Elementary Education
 College of Architecture and Mechanical Engineering
 Department of Social Sciences
 College of Adult Education

Chifeng University Medical College 
The Zhaowuda Union Health School founded in 1958 is the predecessor of the Chifeng University Medical College (CUMC). In July 1962 it changed its name to Inner Mongolia Chifeng Health Schools. In 1966 the school moved to new premises. After half a century of development and training thousands of graduates in April 2003 the school merged with Chifeng University and become CUMC.

The medical college has 1793 undergraduate and junior college students. It has 642 professional and technical people, 139 full-time teachers including 104 undergraduate degree, 17 master's degree, 1 doctor, and 2 PhD, and 9 part-time professors.

Departments 

 Department of Basic and Clinical Medicine (M.B.B.S)
 Department of Oral Medicine (B.D.S)
 Department of Medicine
 Department of Nursing
 Department of Traditional Chinese Medicine

M.B.B.S

Bachelor of Medicine Bachelor of Surgery
 Duration: 5 Years (4 Years Study + 1 Year Internship)
 Course: Human Anatomy, histology, embryology, biochemistry, physiology, pathology, pharmacology, diagnostics, preventive medicine,
internal medicine, surgery, obstetrics and gynecology, pediatrics, medical psychology, medical ethics

B.D.S

Bachelor of Dental Surgery
 Duration: 5 Years (4 Years Study + 1 Year Internship)
 Courses: Anatomy, physiology, biochemistry, pathology, medical microbiology, diagnostics, internal medicine, surgery, oral anatomy
and physiology, oral tissue pathology, oral medicine (dental endodontics, dental diseases), Oral and Maxillofacial Surgery, Prosthodontics, Orthodontics

Affiliated hospitals
Chifeng University Medical College has 2 affiliated hospitals, 8 teaching hospitals and 3 pharmaceutical companies as a teaching and practice base, fully able to meet the professional, clinical teaching at all levels of students and trainees, practice requirements.

First Affiliated Hospital

First Affiliated Hospital is a III B hospital, established in 1980, having 1000 beds with first class facilities of cardiac surgery, brain surgery, the general surgery, orthopedics and other difficult surgery in the autonomous region.

Second Affiliated Hospital

Second Affiliated Hospital has 400 beds, consists of 25 clinical and medical departments with 113 professional and technical personnel having facilities of CT, X-ray machines, C-arm and other large equipment.

Facilities

Classrooms 

In the university, many modern teaching and research facilities have been set up, such as the experiment center, the computer center, the multimedia classrooms, the aural-oral labs and the computer network.

Laboratory 

Medical laboratory building construction area is 16,087 square meters including 49 laboratories. These laboratories are four time funded by the Hong Kong Chinese Foundation and WHO.

Hostel 

There are separate hostels for boys and girls. The hostels provided by university to the international students are two or four persons share a room with, attached bathroom, bed with required amenities and furniture, free hot drinking water, heater, internet access, public laundry.

International co-operation 
The university insists in running the school in an open manner, enhancing the communication and the cooperation with outside, setting up the favorable cooperating relationship with the related institutions of other countries. 
 United States
 United Kingdom
 Germany
 France
 Canada
 Japan
 South Korea
 Mongolia
Further, the university has appointed many foreign professors to participate in teaching, thereby enhancing and improving the foreign language teaching level.

The teaching principle is to base itself upon the local area, face the whole region, cover the vicinity, to train the application-type and skill-type high-level special persons for the local economy construction and the social development. The object is to build into an all-around university incorporating the common higher education, the adult education and the higher vocational education.

External links
 Official website in Chinese
 Website for medical inscriptions in English

Universities and colleges in Inner Mongolia
Educational institutions established in 2003
2003 establishments in China